Boudewijn Röell (born 12 May 1989) is a Dutch rower. He is a dual Olympian and a representative at World Rowing Championships. He won the bronze medal in the eight at the 2015 World Rowing Championships and in the eight at the 2016 Summer Olympics in Rio de Janeiro. He raced in the men's coxless four at Tokyo 2021 and finished in sixth place.

External links
 

1989 births
Living people
Dutch male rowers
Sportspeople from The Hague
Rowers at the 2016 Summer Olympics
Rowers at the 2020 Summer Olympics
Olympic rowers of the Netherlands
Olympic bronze medalists for the Netherlands
Olympic medalists in rowing
Medalists at the 2016 Summer Olympics
World Rowing Championships medalists for the Netherlands
21st-century Dutch people
20th-century Dutch people